Heaven Knows is the debut studio album by British soul singer Jaki Graham. It was released in September 1985 by EMI Records.

Critical reception

Paul Sexton of Record Mirror felt that "the sound's just that bit too fierce, too hi-tech almost, for her to shine", and that overall, "for the singles, excellent; for some of the rest, Jaki can and will do miles better".

Track listing
 

 Sides one and two were combined as tracks 1–10 on CD reissues.

Charts

References 

1985 debut albums
Jaki Graham albums
Parlophone albums
EMI Records albums
Capitol Records albums
Funk albums by English artists